Chardi Mpindi Landu (born 18 July 2000) is a Dutch professional footballer who plays as a forward for Eredivisie club PEC Zwolle.

Career
Landu played youth football for Twente before moving to the academy of English club Brentford. After three seasons, he returned to the Netherlands to join the youth academy of PEC Zwolle.

He made his professional debut for PEC Zwolle on 15 August 2021 in a 1–0 home defeat to SBV Vitesse.

Personal life
Born in the Netherlands, Landu is of Congolese descent.

References

2000 births
Living people
Dutch footballers
Dutch expatriate footballers
Dutch people of Democratic Republic of the Congo descent
Association football forwards
FC Twente players
Brentford F.C. players
PEC Zwolle players
Eredivisie players
Expatriate footballers in England
Dutch expatriate sportspeople in England